The 2022 Paris–Tours was the 116th edition of the Paris–Tours road cycling classic. It was held on 9 October 2022 as part of the 2022 UCI ProSeries calendars.

Teams 
14 of the 19 UCI WorldTeams, six UCI ProTeams, and four UCI Continental teams made up the 25 teams that participated in the race. Of the 160 riders who started the race, 128 finished. Philippe Gilbert, Niki Terpstra and Sebastian Langeveld retired as professional road cyclists after the race.

UCI WorldTeams

 
 
 
 
 
 
 
 
 
 
 
 
 
 

UCI ProTeams

 
 
 
 
 
 

UCI Continental Teams

Result

References

External links 
 

2022
Paris–Tours
Paris–Tours
Paris–Tours